National Route 364 is a national highway of Japan connecting Ōno, Fukui and Kaga, Ishikawa in Japan, with a total length of 62.8 km (39.02 mi).

References

National highways in Japan
Roads in Fukui Prefecture
Roads in Ishikawa Prefecture